is a Japanese slalom canoeist who has competed at the international level since 2006.

At the 2008 Summer Olympics in Beijing, he was eliminated in the qualifying round of the K1 event finishing in 18th place. Four years later at the London games he was able to qualify for the final of the K1 event where he finished in 9th place.

Kazuki Yazawa also qualified for the 2016 Summer Olympics in Rio de Janeiro where it was reported that in addition to being an Olympian, he is also a Buddhist priest. He finished the K1 event in 11th place.

His sister Aki Yazawa is also an Olympic slalom canoeist.

World Cup individual podiums

1 Asia Canoe Slalom Championship counting for World Cup points

References

1989 births
Canoeists at the 2008 Summer Olympics
Canoeists at the 2012 Summer Olympics
Canoeists at the 2016 Summer Olympics
Living people
Japanese male canoeists
Olympic canoeists of Japan
Asian Games medalists in canoeing
Canoeists at the 2010 Asian Games
Asian Games silver medalists for Japan
Medalists at the 2010 Asian Games
People from Iida, Nagano